Liebenau is the 7th District of the Austrian city of Graz. The district is located in the southeastern part of the city. It is bordered to the north by the 6th District, Jakomini, and on the east by the 8th district, St. Peter. In Liebenau, farms still exist alongside the shopping centres and largescale industrial holdings, including the Magna Steyr car plant.

Geography
Area
7.99 km²
Population
 12,386  (01.01.2007)
Postal Code
 8041 8042 8074

External links